Sergio Arenas Llagostera (born 11 March 1989) is a Spanish footballer who plays as a goalkeeper.

Football career
Born in Albacete, Castile-La Mancha, Arenas represented Albacete Balompié as a youth. After making his senior debut with the reserves in Tercera División in 2009, he made his first team debut on 24 October of that year in a 0–4 Segunda División away loss against UD Las Palmas; he replaced field player Juanmi Callejón as Jesús Cabrero was sent off, and also saved a penalty kick.

In 2010 Arenas moved to another reserve team, Getafe CF B in Segunda División B. On 14 July 2012 he returned to Albacete and its B-side, and featured regularly during the season.

On 13 July 2013, Arenas signed for UD Almansa also in the fourth division. On 10 July 2015, after two years as an undisputed starter, he joined fellow league team CD Badajoz.

On 23 July 2016, Arenas agreed to a contract with CF Talavera de la Reina in the fourth tier. He was a first-choice during his first campaign, as his side achieved promotion to the third level.

On 2019 Arenas joined to Japanese club Suzuka Unlimited. He was released at the end of 2020 season.

References

External links
Sergio Arenas profile at Fútbol Manchego 

Sergio Arenas at La Preferente

1989 births
Living people
Sportspeople from Albacete
Spanish footballers
Spanish expatriate footballers
Footballers from Castilla–La Mancha
Association football goalkeepers
Segunda División players
Segunda División B players
Tercera División players
Atlético Albacete players
Albacete Balompié players
Getafe CF B players
CD Badajoz players
CF Talavera de la Reina players
Japan Football League players
Suzuka Point Getters players
Spanish expatriate sportspeople in Japan
Expatriate footballers in Japan